Mary Aiko Shimoji Melendez (born December 16, 1975), known professionally as Aiko Melendez, is a Filipina actress and politician. Her father, Jimmy Melendez (born Jim Shinoji), was an actor. Her half-brother, Jam Melendez (son of Jimmy Melendez and Deborah Sun), also entered showbusiness.

Aiko Melendez started as a child star in the early '80s under Regal Films among them, Santa Claus is Coming to Town in 1982 and she was billed simply as Aiko. In the late '80s, the same movie outfit, launched her together with Ruffa Gutierrez and Carmina Villaroel as teen actresses. From the late '80s through '90s, she became a blockbuster leading lady to big actors such as Richard Gomez, Jomari Yllana and Aga Muhlach. She received multiple awards for May Minamahal in 1993 and Sa 'yo Lamang in 1995. Her 1997 film, Kahit Kailan, received several awards at the Metro Manila Film Festival (MMFF). The movie was produced by Lily Monteverde. In the late 2000s, she starred in TV shows. In 2017, she garnered praises for her work in Wildflower, a primetime soap opera.

Career
Melendez was discovered in the late 1980s and signed a contract with Regal Films, becoming one of their 'Regal Babies'.

In 2001, Melendez ran for councilor of the 2nd district of Quezon City and won. She was reelected in 2004 and in 2007 and remained in office for 9 years until 2010. She ran for vice mayor of Quezon City in 2010 as the running mate of Mike Defensor, but lost to Joy Belmonte.

She did several shows on GMA Network but most often appeared on ABS-CBN. In 2011, Aiko returned to ABS-CBN for an episode of Maalaala Mo Kaya and Reputasyon. In 2013, she was part of the TV series Apoy Sa Dagat. In 2015, Melendez played the role of Fionna Vargas in Inday Bote. In 2017, Melendez played the role of Emilia Ardiente in Wildflower. In 2018, Melendez played the role of Matadora/Bighani in Bagani. In 2019, Melendez returned to GMA Network to play a role in Prima Donnas.

Melendez ran for Quezon City councilor in 2022, this time at the 5th district, and won.

Personal life
Melendez was married to actor Jomari Yllana from 2000, but got separated after a year. They have a son named Andrei. Their marriage was annulled in 2004.

In 2006, Melendez married Martin Jickain, with whom she has a daughter named Marthena. However, their marriage was annulled in 2010.

Melendez is currently dating Zambales's 1st district representative Jefferson "Jay" Khonghun.

In 2013, Melendez converted to Born Again Christianity.

Filmography

Television

Movies

TV commercials
Rexona (May 1994)
Pigromix (August 1984)

Awards
Best Actress for Maalaala Mo Kaya, FAP Luna Awards 1995
Celebrity Inductee, Eastwood City Walk Of Fame Philippines 2014 - Won
Best Supporting Actress for Iadya Mo Kami, 15th Gawad Tanglaw Awards 2017
Pinakapasadong Katuwang na Aktres for Iadya Mo Kami, 19th Gawad PASADO Awards
Best Drama Supporting Actress for Wildflower, 31st PMPC Star Awards for Television
Best Supporting Actress for Rainbow's Sunset, 44th Metro Manila Film Festival
Pinakapasadong Katuwang na Aktres for Rainbow's Sunset, 21st Gawad PASADO Awards
Favorite Kontrabida for Prima Donnas, RAWR Awards 2020
Best Drama Supporting Actress for Prima Donnas, 34th PMPC Star Awards for Television

References

External links
 - Official website
 

1975 births
Living people
Filipino film actresses
Filipino television actresses
That's Entertainment (Philippine TV series)
Filipino television personalities
Filipino people of Japanese descent
That's Entertainment Monday Group Members
Filipino people of Spanish descent
People from Quezon City
Quezon City Council members
Metro Manila city and municipal councilors
Actresses from Metro Manila
Nacionalista Party politicians
Pwersa ng Masang Pilipino politicians
20th-century Filipino actresses
21st-century Filipino actresses
Actresses of Japanese descent
Converts to evangelical Christianity from Roman Catholicism
Filipino Christians
Filipino evangelicals
Filipino actor-politicians
GMA Network personalities
ABS-CBN personalities